The Sylva is a river in Sverdlovsk Oblast and Perm Krai in Russia. The Sylva flows into the Chusovoy Cove of the Kama Reservoir. It freezes up in November and stays under the ice until April. Principal tributaries: Iren, Babka, Irgina, Vogulka (left); Barda, Shakva (right). Main port: Kungur.

Every year hundreds of tourists come to Kungur, through routes down the Sylva, Iren and Shakva rivers.

Inhabited localities
The town of Kungur
The urban-type settlement of Suksun
The village of Molyobka

References 

 

Rivers of Perm Krai
Rivers of Sverdlovsk Oblast